Otryby is a village and part of Soběšín in Kutná Hora District in the Central Bohemian Region of the Czech Republic. It has about 80 inhabitants.

References

Neighbourhoods in the Czech Republic
Populated places in Kutná Hora District